Behzod   is a Russian masculine surname, its feminine counterpart is Lobanova. It may refer to:

Alexander Lobanov (1924–2003), Russian outsider artist
Alexander Lobanov (footballer) (born 1986), Uzbekistani football goalkeeper 
Andrey Lobanov (born 1972), Kazakhstani archer
Dmitri Lobanov (born 1990), Russian football player
Elena Lobsanova, Russian-Canadian ballet dancer
Evgeny Lobanov (born 1984), Russian ice hockey goaltender
Igor Lobanov (born 1969), Russian Olympic luger and rock musician
Liliya Lobanova (born 1985), Ukrainian runner 
Nikita Lobanov (art collector) (born 1935), Russian art collector
Nataliya Kuznetsova-Lobanova (1947–1998), Russian diver
Sergei Lobanov (born 1984), Russian football player
Sergei Lobanov (born 2001), Russian chess player
Valentīns Lobaņovs (born 1971), Latvian football midfielder
Vasily Lobanov (born 1947), Russian composer and pianist
Vladimir Lobanov (1953–2007), Russian speed skater 
Yuri Lobanov (1952–2017), Tajik sprint canoer
Lobanov-Rostovsky family
Alexey Lobanov-Rostovsky (1824–1896), Russian statesman
Andrei Lobanov-Rostovsky (1892–1979), Russian-American historian
Dmitry Lobanov-Rostovsky (1758–1838), Russian Prince and statesman
Yakov Lobanov-Rostovsky (1660–1732), Russian statesman and civil servant
Yakov Lobanov-Rostovsky (1760–1831), Russian statesman

Russian-language surnames